The 2023 Copa Conecta was the 2nd edition of the Copa Conecta, a knockout competition for Mexican football clubs from Liga Premier and Liga TDP.

The Copa Conecta is an official Mexican tournament that was created in 2021 with the aim of providing a greater opportunity for development to the soccer players of the Premier and TDP league teams.

Qualified teams

Teams classified at the worst third ranked; fourth place of the 3 groups and Reserve Team champions at Serie A, and the teams ranked in places 1–7 of Serie B.
 Alebrijes de Oaxaca (Serie B – 2nd Place)
 Calor (Serie B – 4th Place)
 Chilpancingo (Serie B – 5th Place)
 Inter Playa del Carmen (Serie A, Group 3 – 5th Place)
 Mazorqueros (Serie B – 1st Place)
 Montañeses (Serie A, Group 3 – 4th Place)
 Pachuca  (Serie A, Group 3 – 1st Place, Reserve Teams Champions)
 Pioneros de Cancún (Serie B – 3rd Place)
 Saltillo (Serie A, Group 2 – 4th Place)
 T'hó Mayas (Serie B – 7th Place)
 Tritones Vallarta (Serie A, Group 1 – 4th Place)
 Zitácuaro (Serie B – 6th Place)

Teams classified at the first place of the 18 groups of the Liga TDP and the top 2 classified in the league coefficient table.
 Artesanos Metepec – (Liga TDP – Group 6)
 Atlético Chavinda – (Liga TDP – Group 11)
 Búhos de Oaxaca – (Liga TDP – Group 2)
 Chihuahua – (Liga TDP – Group 17)
 Delfines UGM – (Liga TDP – Group 3)
 Deportiva Venados – (Liga TDP – Group 1)
 Diablos Tesistán – (Liga TDP – Group 13)
 Dorados de Sinaloa – (Liga TDP – Group 15)
 Halcones Negros – (Liga TDP – Group 8)
 London – (Liga TDP – Group 18)
 Mexiquense – (Liga TDP – Group 5)
 Mineros Reynosa – (Liga TDP – Group 16)
 Muxes – (Liga TDP – Group 4)
 Orgullo Surtam – (Liga TDP – Group 9)
 Poza Rica – (Liga TDP – Group 9, Classified by Coefficient)
 Tepatitlán – (Liga TDP – Group 12)
 Tigres Yautepec – (Liga TDP – Group 7)
 Titanes de Querétaro – (Liga TDP – Group 10)
 Toluca  – (Liga TDP – Group 6, Classified by Coefficient)
 Tuzos UAZ – (Liga TDP – Group 11)

Bracket

Matches

Round of 32
The matches will be played on 17, 18 and 19 January 2023.

|}

Matches

Round of 16

|}

Matches

Quarter–finals

|}

Matches

Semi–finals

|}

Matches

Final

|}

See also 
2022–23 Serie A de México season
2022–23 Serie B de México season
2022–23 Liga TDP season

References

External links
 Official website of Copa Conecta

1